Alfred Walter Toone (14 May 1916 – 15 November 1966) was a Canadian politician, who served as mayor of Victoria, British Columbia, in 1966. He died in office of a heart attack.

References

1916 births
1966 deaths
20th-century Canadian politicians
Mayors of Victoria, British Columbia